Symptomatic of a Greater Ill is the debut studio album by American hip hop duo Darc Mind. It was released on Anticon on August 29, 2006. It peaked at number 29 on the Dusted Top 40 Radio Chart.

Release
Symptomatic of a Greater Ill was recorded between 1995 and 1997 for Loud Records. However, the closing of the label shelved the album for years. In 2006, it was released on Anticon.

Critical reception
Bram Gieben of The Skinny gave the album 5 stars out of 5, calling it "[a] lost classic, resurfacing at just the right time." Marisa Brown of AllMusic said: "It's a great record, thoughtful and aware yet still laid-back and fun, and though it took a while to be released, it's better late than never to hear this, to be reminded of everything that hip-hop can be, both in the past and hopefully, continuing on into the future." Mike Schiller of PopMatters called it "one of 2006's absolutely essential hip-hop releases".

Track listing

Personnel
Credits adapted from liner notes.

 Kev Roc – vocals
 G.M. Web D – production (1, 3, 4, 7, 8, 9), co-production (2)
 X-Ray – production (5, 6, 10), co-production (11), mixing
 C. Escalante – production (2)
 Nick Wiz – production (11)
 Leo Swift – engineering
 Tony Smilos – engineering
 Shlomo Sonnenfeld – engineering
 Mike Davis – art direction, design
 Wes Winship – art direction, design

References

External links
 

2006 debut albums
Anticon albums
East Coast hip hop albums